Peter Wight (born 1950), sometimes credited as Peter Wright, is a British actor. He is best known for his role as Policeman Nige in Early Doors.

Acting career
His television credits include: Our Zoo, Z-Cars, Meantime, Anna Lee, Life on Mars, Holby City, Where the Heart Is, Jane Eyre (1997), Early Doors, Midsomer Murders, Monday Monday, Party Animals, Hit & Miss, The Paradise, The Crown, Brief Encounters and This Time with Alan Partridge. He also appeared in the 2011 miniseries series Case Sensitive and the 2012 series Public Enemies.

Film appearances include Naked, Secrets & Lies, FairyTale: A True Story, Vera Drake, Pride & Prejudice, Babel, All or Nothing, A Bunch of Amateurs, Another Year, Mr. Turner, Hot Fuzz, Persuasion, and Trespass Against Us.

His stage career includes In the Republic of Happiness at the Jerwood Theatre Downstairs at the Royal Court in 2012/13, and in Electra by Sophocles opposite Kristin Scott Thomas and Liz White at the Old Vic Theatre in 2014.

Selected stage credits 
 In Basidon, Royal Court: Jerwood Downstairs, London, 2012
 In the Republic of Happiness, Royal Court: Jerwood Downstairs, London, 2013
 Trelawny of the Wells, Donmar Warehouse, London, 2013
 Much Ado About Nothing, Old Vic, London, 2013
 Electra, Old Vic, London, 2014
 The Red Lion, National Theatre: Dorfman, London, 2015
 Hamlet, Almeida, London, 2017
 Uncle Vanya, Harold Pinter Theatre, London, 2020

Filmography

Film

Television

References

External links

1950 births
English male film actors
English male television actors
Living people
People from Worthing
20th-century English male actors
21st-century English male actors
Male actors from Sussex